Charles Edward Sullivan (May 23, 1903 – May 28, 1935) was a Major League Baseball pitcher. Sullivan was killed in a car accident in 1935.

References

External links

Major League Baseball pitchers
Detroit Tigers players
Marshall Snappers players
Marshall Indians players
Fort Worth Panthers players
Seattle Indians players
Montreal Royals players
Toronto Maple Leafs (International League) players
Jersey City Skeeters players
Wilmington Pirates players
Baseball players from North Carolina
1903 births
1935 deaths
Road incident deaths in North Carolina
Railway accident deaths in the United States